Aran Island may refer to several places:

Arranmore or Aran Island, off the coast of County Donegal in Ireland
Aran Islands, three islands in Galway Bay in Ireland
Isle of Arran, one of the islands of the lower Firth of Clyde in Scotland

See also
 Aran (disambiguation)